Ixtapa is a resort city in Mexico, adjacent to the Pacific Ocean in the municipality of Zihuatanejo de Azueta in the state of Guerrero.

In the 2005 INEGI Census, the population of Ixtapa was 6,406.

Creation of Ixtapa 

In 1968, the Bank of Mexico created a special fund for the creation of new tourist destinations on the country's coastlines. The first two such destinations were Cancún, in the state of Quintana Roo, and Ixtapa, next to the town of  The development of Ixtapa was supported by a loan from the World Bank.

The master plan for Ixtapa was developed by architects Enrique and Agustín Landa Verdugo, who also participated in the choice of the site. Their project defined the tourist destination's street layout and zoning. The project is organized in super-blocks with irregular shapes, with the high-speed streets separating these blocks, and cul-de-sacs within them. A couple of architects were selected to build this city, some are still residents of this town. Architects Miguel Ángel Rojas and Concepción Rivera live and work in this town. The famous Mexican telenovela Marimar was filmed here in 1994.

Transportation
Ixtapa can be reached by air, bus and highway and has its own airport, Ixtapa-Zihuatanejo International. Flights are available from Mexico City, several provincial cities, and various places in the United States and Canada.

Airlines: Aeroméxico, Air Canada, Alaska Airlines, American Airlines, Delta Air Lines, Frontier Airlines, Interjet, Sunwing Airlines, TAR Aerolineas, United Airlines, US Airways and WestJet.

Charter Lines: Apple Vacations, Canjet, Champion Air, Funjet Vacations, Delta Vacations, Ryan International, Global Air, Transat Holidays, Sunwing Vacations, Sun Country, Magnicharters, and others.

Bus Lines: Autovias, Costa Line, Estrella de Oro, Estrella Blanca, La Linea Plus, Parhikuni, Primera Plus, Turistar/Futura, Omnibus de Mexico and others.

Popular culture
Parts of the 1987 film Hot Pursuit with John Cusack, Wendy Gazelle, Robert Loggia, Jerry Stiller, and Ben Stiller (in his first starring role) were filmed in and around the area.

Gallery

See also
Zihuatanejo
Isla Ixtapa

References

External links

Gobierno  Municipal
Ixtapa y Zihuatanejo
Diario abc de Zihuatanejo

Populated places in Guerrero
Beaches of Guerrero